The Castle of Alter do Chão is a medieval castle in civil parish of Alter do Chão, municipality of Alter do Chão, in the district of Portalegre. 

It is classified as a National Monument.

Alter Chao
Castle Alter Chao
Alter Chao